Minyahil Teshome (born 14 November 1985) is an Ethiopian footballer. He currently plays for Saint George, based in Addis Ababa, Ethiopia.

Career

Minyahil is a left-footed, intelligent playmaker who always gives his full for the team. Despite being technically a wing play-maker, he always has an eye for strikers. He unlocks defenses with his well-timed, precise passes, knows when to time his run, and more importantly, how to put the ball in the back of the net. He is great with his first touch and a master at playing one-two's with teammates just near the edge of the box. 
He is a player who is good with short passes and likes to show off his amazing skills and make a mockery of a defense by dribbling past them with his amazing pace; a team player who makes the team click and makes the wingers a huge part of his off the ball generosity by making sublime passes. This is possibly the reason he doesn't assist so much in goals. He began his career with Ethiopian Coffee FC, and joined Dedebit in 2012.

International career
He is part of the Ethiopia national football team since 2011. He is on the list for 2013 African Nations Cup.

In January 2014, coach Sewnet Bishaw invited him to be a part of the Ethiopia squad for the 2014 African Nations Championship. The team was eliminated in the group stages after losing to Congo, Libya and Ghana.

References

External links
 

1985 births
Living people
Ethiopia international footballers
2013 Africa Cup of Nations players
Ethiopian footballers
Sportspeople from Addis Ababa
Association football midfielders
Ethiopia A' international footballers
2014 African Nations Championship players
Saint George S.C. players